The IOA Championship is a tournament on the Epson Tour, the LPGA's developmental tour. It has been a part of the tour's schedule since 2013. It is held at Morongo Golf Club at Tukwet Canyon in Beaumont, California.

The tournament started out as the Volvik Championship held in Florida in 2013, before moving to California in 2014 and changing name to the IOA Championship in 2016.

In 2020, the tournament was postponed due to the COVID-19 pandemic.

Winners

References

External links

Coverage on Epson Tour website

Symetra Tour events
Golf in California
Golf in Florida
Recurring sporting events established in 2013